Edie Britt is a fictional character created by television producer and screenwriter Marc Cherry for the ABC television series Desperate Housewives. Nicollette Sheridan portrayed Edie from her debut in the pilot episode of the series until the character's death in the fifth season.

Within the series, Edie lived at 4362 Wisteria Lane in Fairview. Edie was a real estate agent. She was married three times; to Charles McLain (with whom she had a son, Travers), Umberto Rothwell, and Dave Williams. Throughout her time on the series, she also had numerous relationships with the ex-husbands or former lovers of other characters.

Sheridan's portrayal of the character earned her a nomination for the Golden Globe Award for Best Supporting Actress.

Development and casting

The character Edie Britt was a series regular for the first 5 seasons, despite originally being conceived as a recurring character. Actress Nicollette Sheridan, who originally auditioned for Bree Van de Kamp, one of the series' more prominent roles, was cast in the role in February 2004. On August 11, Sheridan was announced to have joined the main cast for the series' first season, the thirteenth regular cast member to do so. Despite proving popular with fans and critics, Sheridan's role remained somewhat minimal in the series' first two seasons. Series creator Marc Cherry insisted that Edie served "only as a spoiler to complicate the other women's lives." Although Sheridan thought of Edie as the fifth main housewife—in addition to Susan Mayer, Bree Van De Kamp, Lynette Scavo, and Gabrielle Solis—the opening credits only pictured the other four women. Additionally, Cherry shared that his goal was to have the central four women remain in the series.

However, Marcia Cross' maternity leave caused Bree to be absent in several episodes of the third season. Edie's character was elevated in prominence, providing the fourth concurrent storyline for the episodes. During this time, the character's "layers are peeled away and the character is developed on a deeper level than has been previously explored." Despite Cross' return, Edie maintained a more important role throughout seasons four and five until the character's death.

Departure
In February 2009, it was announced that Sheridan would be leaving the show following her character's death, which would involve a car accident and electrical wire. Cherry had confirmed the death of several fan favorites at the beginning of the series' fifth season in September 2008. Rumors of on-set problems with Sheridan and her squabbles with Cherry reportedly led to her departure. Sheridan commented that killing Edie "was a risky decision that could have devastating ramifications," and admitted to feeling ignored by Cherry while on the series. Cherry alleges that the reason behind Edie's death was to cut costs from the series. The series reportedly saved an estimated $100,000 to $200,000 per episode without the cost of Sheridan's salary. In April 2010, Sheridan filed a lawsuit against Cherry, alleging wrongful dismissal and assault and battery, among five other counts. The following June, Sheridan filed an amended claim, clarifying that the alleged assault was a "light tap," but reaffirmed her stance that her contract was wrongfully terminated.

On August 7, 2011, after the announcement that Desperate Housewives would be concluding at the end of its 8th season, Marc Cherry hinted that he may ask Nicollette Sheridan back for the series finale, "to pay homage to everyone who has been on the show", including Edie and without addressing Sheridan's lawsuit. However, while being interviewed on NBC's Today the following day, the actress firmly denied her comeback on Wisteria Lane, saying "That's news to me. [...] I had an amazing time playing that character. I loved her dearly, but they killed her! She's dead."

Storylines

Past
Edie Britt was born in 1967. Her father left her mother for another woman with a daughter when Edie was 16 years old (year 1983). Edie has a sister, and brother who died from a drug overdose. Edie's mother - Ilene (K Callan) - liked to steal and drink, so much so that she ended up in prison. The court gave the Britt siblings a tough woman, curator Mrs. Muntz, to care for them. Mrs. Muntz was much worse than their mother, and Edie was very happy when Ilene was released from prison. As a teenager, Edie spend her time with the "freaks" hanging out by the loading docks, where she would smoke with them. Ilene died when Edie was an adult, alone in a truck.

Edie lost her virginity at a young age, ostensibly because of the lack of a father in her life. She married Dr. Charles McLain (Greg Evigan), with whom she had a son, Travers (Jake Cherry), in 1998. According to Edie, the "only thing [she] learned from Charles was bluffing, because he was bad in bed", and they divorced. She gave Travers up to his father, as she believed she would be a bad mother, but they agreed that she would visit their son from time to time. In 2002 she married gym instructor Umberto Rothwell (Matt Cedeño). In 2003 they moved to 4360 Wisteria Lane and the couple divorced one year later, after she found out that he is gay.

Season 1
Edie is introduced as a serial divorcée, with two marriages behind her at the beginning of the show. Martha Huber (Christine Estabrook) tells Susan that she will be babysitting Edie's son, although he does not appear until season 3. Edie and Susan Mayer are attracted to new neighbor Mike Delfino (James Denton), creating tension between them which culminates in Susan accidentally burning down Edie's house. Edie is upset when Martha is murdered, and proves to be the only Wisteria Lane resident who wants to give her a proper burial. Susan admits to Edie that she burned her house down and Edie uses Susan's guilt to join the housewives' poker group. Edie continues to hit on Mike, however he is more interested in Susan. Edie is upset when Susan and Mike move in together. Edie tries to get the women to convince Susan that Mike is bad for her, but Susan is sure he's the one. Susan later finds out her ex-husband, Karl Mayer (Richard Burgi), cheated on her with Edie while they were married; using this knowledge, Edie and Karl start dating, increasing the tension between her and Susan.

Season 2
Edie finishes rebuilding her new house on the property of 4362 Wisteria Lane and starts dating Karl, Susan's ex-husband. Edie and Susan have many confrontations as Susan tries to deal with some minor jealousy issues. Edie later discovers a wedding ring in Karl's briefcase and suspects Karl plans to propose. In actuality, the ring is because Karl has temporarily remarried Susan so she can access his health insurance to pay for a splenectomy. Susan tells Karl that Edie thinks he's going to propose so he does. Susan's boyfriend, Ron McCready, tells Edie about her and Karl's sham marriage. Angry with them for lying to her, Edie punishes Karl and Susan by deciding Karl will throw her a lavish wedding and Susan will be burdened with the arrangements. However, one morning, Edie wakes up to find Karl leaving permanently, and also discovers that Karl slept with another woman while they were engaged, and breaks the news to the other housewives. Edie is extremely upset and Susan, who feels guilty about unknowingly being the "other woman", tries to make her feel better. Edie begins bonding with Susan, making her feel even more guilty. Eventually, Susan writes Edie a confession letter admitting the truth. Feeling betrayed, Edie retaliates by burning down Susan's house. After discovering Edie was responsible, Susan tries to get a confession out of her whilst wearing a wire, leading to a fight when Edie realizes. Trying to catch Susan, Edie is badly stung by yellowjackets. Susan feels guilty when Edie is hospitalized and tells her she won't give the confession to the police, sparing Edie prison. Edie refuses to accept Susan's pity and vows to get revenge.

Season 3
In the show's third season, Edie declines Susan's attempts to rebuild a friendship. She is present when Mike wakes up from his coma and learns that he has retrograde amnesia and has forgotten the last two years. Edie's revenge on Susan is to take advantage of this. While "helping" Mike fill in the blanks, Edie makes him think that Susan never loved him and that they were miserable together. Edie admits that she's always had a crush on him and how hurt she was that he ignored her. Susan comes by the hospital to give Mike flowers, but catches him having sex with Edie. Edie and Mike start a relationship but Edie ends it when Mike is arrested for the murder of Monique Pollier. Edie's nephew, Austin McCann (Josh Henderson) moves in with her. He starts dating Susan's daughter, Julie Mayer, after the two of them and Edie are held hostage by Carolyn Bigsby (Laurie Metcalf) at the supermarket. Susan disapproves but Edie claims she can't do anything about it because they are in love. Julie gets Edie to pose as her mother so she can get birth control pills. Edie and Susan later catch Austin having sex with Bree's daughter, Danielle Van de Kamp. He is later forced by Orson Hodge to leave Wisteria Lane when Danielle is discovered to be pregnant with his child.

Edie's son, Travers, is introduced for the first time, having been dropped off by his father for a month-long visit. Carlos Solis develops a father/son relationship with Travers as he is constantly called on to look after him. When Edie develops romantic feelings for Carlos, she uses his relationship with Travers to her advantage and tries to seduce him, but he tells her he's not interested in her that way. They eventually sleep together and later start dating. Carlos wants to keep the affair a secret, making Edie think he still holds a torch for Gabrielle. Edie tells the girls about her and Carlos at Gabrielle's engagement party. Gabrielle is furious and demands Edie stop seeing Carlos, but Edie refuses. Gabrielle tries to get her friends to freeze out Edie, but Edie makes it difficult. Gabrielle eventually makes peace with the relationship...for now. Edie considers going for full custody of Travers to keep Carlos around, but Carlos convinces her not to. When Travers is collected by his father, Edie asks Carlos to move in with her. When he declines, Edie visits his landlady, Mrs. Simms, at her nursing home and alleges that Carlos is an addict and alcoholic who uses her home as a place to hook up with prostitutes. Mrs. Simms terminates the lease and evicts Carlos. Edie offers Carlos a place to stay, but he is quick to figure out her involvement in the process. Carlos tells Edie he doesn't love her and she tells him she could be pregnant. After they find that she isn't, she suggests he stay with her and they try for a baby but continues taking the pill, because she doesn't want a baby until he starts to love her. While looking for money in Edie's purse to pay the paper boy, Carlos discovers the pills. At Gaby's wedding, Carlos confronts Edie. She tries to apologize but is unsuccessful. At the closing scene of the season, Edie is shown with a sealed letter to her "beloved" Carlos, and hangs herself with a scarf.

Season 4
In the first episode of season 4, it transpires that Edie's suicide attempt was merely a bid for Carlos' attention. Carlos feels responsible and agrees to resume their relationship, leading Edie to discover his secret offshore bank account containing $10 million. She uses this knowledge to blackmail him, asking him to marry her, unaware that Carlos is having an affair with Gabrielle. Edie goes on to announce their engagement party, but discovers Carlos' betrayal when she, Carlos, and Gabrielle's new husband, Victor Lang (John Slattery), all suffer from crabs. Edie hires a private detective to spy on Carlos and gets pictures of him and Gabrielle sharing a passionate kiss, before telling the IRS about his offshore account. She discovers that Carlos has emptied and closed his offshore account so she turns the pictures over to Victor, knowing he will get revenge. When Victor subsequently goes missing after Gabrielle and Carlos knock him over the side of his yacht, Edie, still feeling vindictive, tells the police that Gaby may be responsible for Victor's disappearance. A tornado is about to hit Wisteria Lane and Carlos and Edie plan to disappear. Gabrielle is given a folder, giving her access to Carlos' offshore bank account. Edie and Gabrielle fight over it but lose the papers in the tornado. They are forced to take shelter together in Edie's crawl space and are able to put aside their differences for a while. Carlos is blinded in the tornado.

Edie finds out Carlos gave her fake jewelry when they were together and gets back at him by staying with him. Edie learns that Carlos' blindness is permanent, when she thought it was only temporary. Later Edie tells Gabrielle that the way she is treating Carlos is sick and that there are other women out there who would treat Carlos better. When Bree and Orson Hodge (Kyle MacLachlan) are having troubles, Edie lets Orson stay with her. Edie later shares a brief drunken kiss with Orson which is seen by Bree, who is looking for Toby the cat. Bree confronts Edie about the kiss. When Edie says it meant nothing, Bree slaps her and a full-scale war erupts between them. Bree sabotages Edie's business by hounding off potential house buyers. Edie visits Orson, who is now living at a hotel, to complain about Bree. When she enters the room, she discovers a piece of paper revealing that Bree's baby is really Austin and Danielle's. Edie threatens to tell everyone about it unless Bree does exactly what she wants. In turn, Bree tells her friends about her faked pregnancy and about Edie's threats. The housewives confront Edie, and tell her that from now on they won't be friends with her anymore and will ignore her whenever she talks to them. Afterward, Edie calls Travers, and tells him she's going to be spending a lot more time with him from now on.

Five-year jump
While off the lane, Edie starts visiting Orson while he is in prison for the hit and run of her ex-boyfriend Mike Delfino. After Bree hears that Edie has been visiting her husband, Bree goes to Edie's new house to confront her. Edie then shames Bree into being a better person. Bree doesn't tell anyone about this until she, Susan, Lynette, Gabrielle and Karen McCluskey go to bring Travers Edie's ashes. This makes Bree the only housewife to see Edie until she returns five years later.

During the five-year jump, Edie begins dating motivational speaker, Dave Williams. Edie proposes and they elope right away. Dave convinces Edie into moving back to Wisteria Lane, though oblivious to her, he has his own agenda.

Season 5
The fifth season is set five years on from the fourth-season finale. Edie returns to Wisteria Lane, five years later, a new and transformed woman. When the housewives notice the change in Edie, they pretend to resume their friendship with her. Dave is persistent in convincing Edie to get along better with her neighbors. He kidnaps Karen McCluskey's cat after she is rude to Edie, only returning him when Karen apologizes. When Karen attempts to investigate Dave's background, Edie realizes she knows very little about his past. Dave's doctor arrives in Fairview and confronts Dave at the White Horse Club, but Dave strangles him and sets fire to the building. Dave has only married Edie to have an excuse to move to Wisteria Lane and get revenge on Mike, as he and Susan were involved in a car accident that killed Dave's wife and daughter. Edie starts to notice something is off about Dave and is irritated that he doesn't show interest in her. One night she wakes up and sees Dave talking to himself. Edie wants to know why he's acting so strangely and Dave tells her he used to be married before he met Edie and that his wife died. Edie is furious he never told her about this before and throws him out of the house. When Edie is locked in a basement with Susan, they have a heart to heart chat and Susan tells Edie not to treat men like tissue and to believe in happily ever afters. After they are freed Edie goes to Dave and tells him to move back in. When Edie learns that Eli Scruggs, the neighborhood handyman, has died, she recalls how he helped her out when she was having marital problems with her ex-husband Umberto. In a flashback, while feeling insecure about her appearance after Umberto turns out to be gay, Eli reassures Edie and makes her feel better and ends up having sex with her.

While at a liquor store, Edie observes an encounter between Dave and Father Drance. Suspicious about her husband's motives, she does a research on his past after Father Drance calls her Mrs. Dash. Determined to know more about her husband's past, Edie goes to the local newspaper archives for information on Dave's family, only to learn that Dave had both a wife and daughter who were killed in a car crash. Later, when she asks Dave how he feels about children, he tells her that his "friend" had a daughter he loved who died in the crash and lives his life wondering what she would've looked like and how old she would've been; he also tells her that he would never have a child as it wouldn't be worth it. Edie is still determined to know a lot more about Dave's past. Upon receiving a news article on the fateful car accident and finally learning the truth about her husband's intentions, she confronts Dave when he returns home from his camping trip. As she attempts to call Mike to warn him, she is almost strangled to death by Dave. Tearful and disorientated, Edie manages to run away and drives down the lane. She almost hits Orson as he stumbles onto the road; swerving to miss him, she hits an electric post instead. Dazed and unaware that the power line had snapped and there is water underneath the car, Edie steps out. She receives an electric shock, falls to the ground and dies a few minutes later.

The housewives pay a visit to Travers (Stephen Lunsford) to announce her death and to give him her ashes. On the journey up each of the housewives and Karen McCluskey share memories of Edie. In one flashback, Susan and Edie did get along in the beginning, until Susan finds out Edie is having sex with her neighbor's husband. In another flashback, Edie takes Lynette out to help her acquire the courage to beat cancer. In another flashback, Edie tells Bree that she has been visiting Orson because Bree can't bring herself to enter the visiting room at all since he went to jail. In another flashback, Edie reveals to Gabrielle that she always knew she wouldn't live a long life, and she should live it up while she still can. However, although Edie was right, Gabrielle convinced her that in 50 years time they would still go out and still be the hottest ladies on the lane. And in a final flashback, Edie visits Karen McCluskey on the anniversary of her son's death. Edie explains that she gave her son to her ex because she wanted him to have a good life and she knew that she would have made a bad mother. Karen says she hopes she isn't making a mistake, and Edie replies "Me too".  Once they arrive, however, Travers tells them that they were her closest friends and that they should spread the ashes wherever they see fit. Ultimately, her ashes are spread around Wisteria Lane. Edie was at peace about her death and had no regrets because she lived her life to the fullest and to her it was "a one of a kind life."

Edie appears briefly in "Everybody Says Don't" as a hallucination of Dave's, revealing his thoughts. Edie says that his plans to kill M.J. on the fishing trip, pretending it was an "accident" is a boring plan, and that he might as well kill M.J right then and there. She says that Susan would suffer more if she knew why M.J. died. She then says in a mocking tone that everyone would finally know what he's been going through.

References

Desperate Housewives characters
Television characters introduced in 2004
Fictional attempted suicides
Fictional real estate brokers
Fictional housewives